David Story Caldwell (April 27, 1891 – January 6, 1953) was an American runner.  He competed in the 800 m at the 1912 Summer Olympics and finished in fourth place.

In 1915 Caldwell won the AAU indoor 1,000 yard title; outdoors he was second over 880 yd in 1912 and third in 1915. After graduating from University of Massachusetts Caldwell became a farmer in northeastern Massachusetts. He also served as the postmaster in his native South Byfield and a volunteer athletics coach at the nearby Governor Dummer Academy.

References

1891 births
1953 deaths
American male middle-distance runners
Olympic track and field athletes of the United States
Athletes (track and field) at the 1912 Summer Olympics